Lhamoy Zingkha Gewog is a gewog (village block) of Dagana District, Bhutan. It also comprises part of Lhamoy Zingkha Dungkhag (sub-district), along with Deorali and Nichula Gewogs.

In 2007, Lhamoy Zingkha Dungkhag was formally transferred from Sarpang Dzongkhag to Dagana Dzongkhag, affecting the town of Lhamozingkha and three constituent gewogs – Lhamozingkha, Deorali and Nichula (Zinchula) – that formed the westernmost part of Sarpang and became the southernmost part of Dagana.

References 

Gewogs of Bhutan
Dagana District